eM Client is a Windows and macOS based email client for sending and receiving emails, managing calendars, tasks, contacts, and notes. Live chat is integrated as well. It was developed as a user-friendly alternative to existing email clients and calendar solutions.

eM Client was originally released in 2007 and has provided updated versions (the latest version 9 of the software was released in February 2022).

Features 
eM Client has a range of features for handling email, including advanced rules management, mass mail, delayed send, or a built-in translator for incoming and outgoing messages. It supports signatures, Quick Text, and tagging and categorization for easy searching. Watch for Replies and Snooze Email functions are available, as well as direct cloud attachments from cloud services like Dropbox, Google Drive, OneDrive, ownCloud or Nextcloud.

eM Client provides also a lookup service for GnuPG public keys (eM Keybook) in order to more easily send encrypted communication via email, and generally simplify PGP encryption in email communication.

Since eM Client 8.2, Online Meetings are supported (via Zoom, MS Teams, and Google Meet).

eM Client allows extensive appearance customization (including a visual theme editor).

Email support

eM Client supports all major email platforms including Exchange, Gmail, Google Workspace, Office365, iCloud and any POP3, SMTP, IMAP or CalDAV server.

Automatic setup works for Gmail, Exchange, Office 365, Outlook, iCloud, or other major email services. Recently, auto-import option was added to transfer data from IncrediMail as well.

Server compatibility 
eM Client is compatible with:

 Google Workspace
 iCloud
 MS Office 365
 MS Outlook (Outlook.com)
 MS Exchange
 IceWarp
 SmarterMail
 GMX FreeMail
 Kerio
 MDaemon
 Mailfence
 SOGo

System requirements
For Windows:
 Windows 7 or higher
 350 MB of free space for installation (+additional space for data, which can be stored on a different drive if needed - since eM Client has no limit on the number of emails/data stored in its database, the only limitation is the capacity of user's hard drive)
 Minimum of 2 GB of RAM and 1.6 GHz CPU

For macOS:
 OS X 10.11 and the newer versions are supported
 Only the last three macOS versions are officially supported, but eM Client 8 can still run on El Capitan

eM Client uses Microsoft .NET 6.

References

Email clients
Personal information managers
Calendaring software